The Putative Sulfate Exporter (PSE) Family (TC# 2.A.98) is composed of several putative 10 or 11 transmembrane segment (TMS) proteins. This family is part of the CPA superfamily and its members are found in diverse bacteria and archaea. The genes encoding some of these homologues may be induced by growth in the presence of cysteate (suyZ) or taurine (tauZ). Although they differ in structure, these proteins are most closely related to the 12 TMS members of the CPA superfamily and exhibit demonstrable homology to the MadML malonate:H+ symporter (TC #2.A.70), although their sequence similarity is low.

See also 
 Transporter Classification Database

Further reading 
 Brüggemann, Chantal; Denger, Karin; Cook, Alasdair M.; Ruff, Jürgen (2004-04-01). "Enzymes and genes of taurine and isethionate dissimilation in Paracoccus denitrificans". Microbiology150 (Pt 4): 805–816. doi:10.1099/mic.0.26795-0.ISSN 1350-0872. PMID 15073291.

References 

Protein families
Membrane proteins
Transmembrane proteins
Transmembrane transporters
Transport proteins
Integral membrane proteins